The Weather of the Future: Heat Waves, Extreme Storms, and Other Scenes From a Climate-Changed Planet is a 2010 book by climatologist Heidi Cullen. Cullen takes as her starting point the "clear and present dangers" posed by the greenhouse gases which result from the burning fossil fuels. She offers a vision of what life might be like in a warmer world. Cullen predicts "more frequent and more violent storms, more hot spells, cold spells, droughts, famines and huge waves of desperate refugees".

See also
An Inconvenient Truth
Climate refugee
Effects of climate change
Extreme weather
Global warming controversy
Storms of My Grandchildren
The Weather Makers

References

External links
Excerpt from the book

Climate change books
2010 non-fiction books
2010 in the environment
Environmental non-fiction books